The Broadway Line was a public transit line in Brooklyn, New York City, United States along Broadway between Williamsburg and East New York. Originally a streetcar line, it later became a bus route, but no bus currently operates over the entire length of Broadway, with the BMT Jamaica Line above.

History
The Broadway Railroad began running over Broadway, from the Broadway Ferry in Williamsburg to the East New York Depot, on March 22, 1859. A short branch to Bushwick, outbound on Hooper Street, South Fifth Street, and Montrose Avenue to Bushwick Avenue, and inbound on Johnson Avenue, was built in late 1860.

References

Streetcar lines in Brooklyn